John Vincent Byrne (born May 9, 1928) is an American marine geologist and academic. He served as the 12th President of Oregon State University from 1984 to 1995.

Early life and education 
Born in Hempstead, New York, Byrne attended Hamilton College, where he earned a Bachelor of Science in marine geology in 1951. He later earned a Master of Science degree in geology from Columbia University in 1953 and a Ph.D in marine geology from the University of Southern California in 1957.

Career 
Byrne came to Oregon State University in 1960 and served until 1981, during which time he served as the school's first Dean of Oceanography, Vice President for Research and Graduate Studies and Dean of Research. Between 1972 and 1977, he was the Director of the Hatfield Marine Science Center. 

In 1981, Byrne was nominated by president Ronald Reagan to serve as the 3rd Administrator of the National Oceanic and Atmospheric Administration. He held the position until 1984, when he returned to Oregon State and was appointed president, succeeding Robert W. MacVicar. Byrne served until his retirement in 1995, when he was succeeded by Paul G. Risser.

Personal life 
Byrne resides in Corvallis, Oregon.

References

External links
 John Byrne Oral History Interview

1928 births
Columbia Graduate School of Arts and Sciences alumni
Hamilton College (New York) alumni
Living people
Marine geologists
National Oceanic and Atmospheric Administration personnel
People from Hempstead (village), New York
Presidents of Oregon State University
University of Southern California alumni